Taliwang is the regency seat of West Sumbawa Regency, on the western coast of the island of Sumbawa. It is the fifth largest town on the island of Sumbawa, with a population of 44,136 at the 2010 Census and 55,340 at the 2020 Census.

Geography
The town is located on the western coast of the Sumbawa island.

Climate
Taliwang has a tropical savanna climate (Aw) with moderate to little rainfall from April to October and heavy rainfall from November to March.

References

External links 
 

Populated places in West Nusa Tenggara
Regency seats of West Nusa Tenggara